Lucile Miller Observatory  is an astronomical observatory owned by Catawba County Schools and operated by the Catawba Valley Astronomy Club.  It is located on the campus of Maiden Middle School in Maiden,  North Carolina (USA), which is the former location of Maiden High School.

See also 
 Miller Observatory, LINCOLN NEBRASKA
List of observatories

References

External links
Lucile Miller Observatory Clear Sky Clock Forecasts of observing conditions.

Astronomical observatories in North Carolina
Buildings and structures in Catawba County, North Carolina
Education in Catawba County, North Carolina
Tourist attractions in Catawba County, North Carolina